Aldino Herdianto (born 1 November 1988 in Binjai, Indonesia) is an Indonesian professional footballer who plays as a forward for Liga 3 club Serpong City.

Club career

PSMS Medan
In 2015, Aldino joined PSMS Medan in 2015 Piala Kemerdekaan, In a match against Persinga Ngawi, he scored in 61st minute. Score 1-1 for PSMS Medan. When in injury time of second half, Legimin Raharjo scored for PSMS Medan, 2-1 for PSMS. With this result, PSMS became champion in Piala Kemerdekaan

PS TNI
Aldino made his debut against Madura United F.C. in the first week 2016 Indonesia Soccer Championship A although only as a substitute.

And in this competition, he has scored as many as 8 goals

Mitra Kukar
In 2017, Aldino join Mitra Kukar along with teammate, Wiganda Pradika. He made his debut on 15 April 2017 in a match against Barito Putera. On 1 June 2018, Aldino scored his first goal for Mitra Kukar against Perseru Serui in the 51st minute at the Aji Imbut Stadium, Tenggarong.

PSMS Medan
In 2019, Aldino signed a contract with Indonesian Liga 2 club PSMS Medan.

Bali United
He was signed for Bali United to play in Liga 1 in the 2019 middle season. Aldino made his debut on 18 October 2019 in a match against Borneo. On 16 December 2019, Aldino scored his first goal for Bali United against Arema in the 14th minute at the Kanjuruhan Stadium, Malang.

Badak Lampung
In 2020, Aldino signed a contract with Indonesian Liga 2 club Badak Lampung. This season was suspended on 27 March 2020 due to the COVID-19 pandemic. The season was abandoned and was declared void on 20 January 2021.

Semen Padang
In 2021, Aldino signed a contract with Indonesian Liga 2 club Semen Padang. He made his league debut on 6 October against PSPS Riau at the Gelora Sriwijaya Stadium, Palembang.

Club honours
PSMS Medan
 Piala Kemerdekaan: 2015
Bali United
 Liga 1: 2019

References

External links
 

1988 births
Living people
Indonesian footballers
People from Binjai
PSMS Medan players
Mitra Kukar players
Bali United F.C. players
Badak Lampung F.C. players
Badak Lampung F.C.
Liga 2 (Indonesia) players
Liga 1 (Indonesia) players
Association football forwards
Sportspeople from North Sumatra